Joshua Kerr (born 8 October 1997) is a Scottish middle-distance runner who competes primarily in the 1500 metres. He is the 2020 Tokyo Olympic bronze medallist in the event. At the World Athletics Championships, Kerr placed sixth in 2019 and fifth in 2022.

He won the gold medal at the 2015 European Junior Championships, and represented Great Britain at the 2017 World Championships but did not reach the semifinals.

Career
During the postponed 2020 Tokyo Olympics in 2021, Kerr claimed the bronze medal in his specialist event after posting a personal best time of 3m 29.05s, narrowly missing out on silver.

On 27 February 2022, he set an unofficial European mile indoor record (the third fastest mark of all time in the world at the time), and 1500 m & mile British and Scottish indoor records to claim victory at the Boston University Last Chance Meet. With his time of 3:48.87 and 1500 m split of 3:32.86 en route, he broke Eamonn Coghlan's European mile record dating back to 1983, and two Peter Elliott's UK bests, which were set in 1990.

International competitions

Personal bests
Information taken from World Athletics profile.

 800 metres – 1:45.35 (Azusa, CA 2019)
 800 metres indoor – 1:46.64 (Spokane, WA 2022)
 1500 metres – 3:29.05 (Tokyo 2021) ( Scottish)
 1500 metres indoor – 3:32.86 (Boston, MA 2022)
 One mile – 3:53.88 (London 2019)
 One mile indoor – 3:48.87 (Boston, MA 2022) ( Scottish) #3rd fastest of all time
 3000 metres – 8:35.15 (Bedford 2014)
 3000 metres indoor – 7:33.47 (New York, NY 2023) ( Scottish)
 5000 metres – 13:23.78  (Irvine, CA 2021)

References

External links

 

1997 births
Living people
Scottish male middle-distance runners
World Athletics Championships athletes for Great Britain
Sportspeople from Edinburgh
Scottish expatriate sportspeople in the United States
New Mexico Lobos men's track and field athletes
Athletes (track and field) at the 2020 Summer Olympics
Olympic athletes of Great Britain
Medalists at the 2020 Summer Olympics
Olympic bronze medallists for Great Britain
Olympic bronze medalists in athletics (track and field)
Scottish Olympic medallists